The Distance Education Accrediting Commission (DEAC), formerly the National Home Study Council and then as the Distance Education and Training Council, is a non-profit national educational accreditation agency in the United States specializing in the accreditation of (51 percent or more) distance education programs of study and institutions. The U.S. Department of Education identifies DEAC to be among the recognized institutional accrediting agencies in the U.S. that are reliable authorities on the quality of education offered by the institutions they accredit.

History 
The DEAC was established in 1926 as the National Home Study Council (NHSC), a trade association for correspondence schools. Its formation was in response to a Carnegie Corporation study that found a lack of standards to ensure quality in correspondence schools and protect their students and the public from fraud. Under its first director, John Noffsinger, the NHSC developed a list of minimum standards for proprietary schools.

The NHSC adopted the name Distance Education and Training Council (DETC) in 1994 and its current name in 2014.

Also in 2014, Dr. Leah Matthews, Chief Executive Officer and Executive Director of DEAC, wrote an article that attributes distance education learning vs. traditional learning in part, to constant changes in the education landscape. “Distance education institutions are uniquely positioned to meet the changing demands for enhanced technologies and higher education program delivery. Some view this as a threat to the traditional higher education model as opposed to a strategic opportunity. More than ever before, technology-enhanced learning has the potential to transform higher education accessibility and raise the level of education attained globally.”

Accreditation
In 1959 the NHSC was formally recognized by the U.S. Office of Education as an accreditor of higher education institutions. Currently the DEAC is recognized by Council for Higher Education Accreditation and the United States Department of Education as an accreditor of institutions of higher education. According to the DEAC, it is made up of over 100 distance education institutions located in 21 states and 7 countries. These institutions include non-profit institutions, trade associations, for-profit companies, colleges and universities, and military organizations. The DEAC has strict criteria for approving schools for accreditation, and the process includes examining the schools' educational, ethical, and business practices.

Comparison with regional accreditation

DEAC is a national accreditor category. DEAC also uses independent subject specialists drawn primarily from regionally accredited institutions to review the courses/programs of applicants for accreditation or reaccreditation, as well as in evaluating any new programs. DEAC shares many of the same subject specialist evaluators working in regionally accredited higher education institutions used by the American Council on Education for its Credit Recommendation reviews."

Each college or university cannot guarantee acceptance of transfer credits and the receiving college or university formulates its own transfer credit policies for admission. It is the receiving college or universities responsibility to provide reasonable and definitive transfer policies and to fairly judge the quality and quantity of the transfer students work. The Council for Higher Education Accreditation (CHEA) offered an opinion in a November 2000 statement that, "Institutions and accreditors need to assure that transfer decisions are not made solely on the source of accreditation of a sending program or institution." The Higher Education Transfer Alliance (HETA) online directory was designed by DEAC to help students and the public find educational institutions with transfer practices consistent with criteria articulated by CHEA in its Statement to the Community: Transfer and Public Interest. According to CHEA, institutions that are members of HETA have agreed that their "transfer decisions are not made solely on the basis of the accredited status of a sending institution and that the institution has agreed at least to consider transfer requests from other institutions." The HETA directory provides links to member institutions so that students and others can review a specific institution's transfer policies and practice.

See also
 List of universities accredited by DEAC
 List of recognized accreditation associations of higher learning
 Educational accreditation

References

External links
 
 HETA Directory

 
Organizations established in 1926
Educational organizations based in the United States
Non-profit organizations based in Washington, D.C.